Begonia sarmentosa is a species of flowering plant in the family Begoniaceae. It is found in the Philippines.

See also 
 List of Begonia species

References

External links 

 Begonia sarmentosa at The Plant List
 Begonia sarmentosa at Tropicos

sarmentosa
Plants described in 1983
Flora of the Philippines